"2nd Floor" is a song recorded by English band the Creatures (aka singer Siouxsie Sioux and drummer Budgie). It was co-produced by Warne Livesey.

It was the lead single of Anima Animus, the third album by the Creatures. Prior to this release, the band had already issued a stand-alone single, "Sad Cunt", in a limited edition in May 1998 and the Eraser Cut EP in August.

"2nd Floor" was released in two formats. The 7" vinyl edition included "2nd Floor" and "Turn It On (Bound 'N' Gagged Mix)". The CD single included those two tracks as well as "2nd Floor (Girl Eats Boy's Remix)". A 12" edition was issued in the U.S. in 1999.

Notes

1998 singles
The Creatures songs
1997 songs
Songs written by Siouxsie Sioux
Songs written by Budgie (musician)